Amanda Sampedro Bustos (born 26 June 1993) is a Spanish football forward who plays for Atlético Madrid of Spain's Primera División and the Spain national team.

International career
A skillful forward noted for her creativity and vision, she was part of the Spanish team which won the 2010 UEFA U-17 Women's Championship and finished third at the subsequent 2010 FIFA U-17 Women's World Cup.

In 2012, Sampedro was captain of the Spain team which reached the final of the 2012 UEFA Women's U-19 Championship, where they were beaten 1–0 by Sweden after extra time. After the competition UEFA named her among ten "emerging talents".

In September 2012, Sampedro was called up to the senior national squad for the first time, ahead of a UEFA Women's Euro 2013 qualifying match with Romania. In June 2013, national team coach Ignacio Quereda called Sampedro up to his 23-player squad for the UEFA Women's Euro 2013 finals in Sweden. She was also part of Spain's squad at the 2015 FIFA Women's World Cup in Canada.

International goals

Personal life
In March 2013 Sampedro was in the second year of a sports journalism course at King Juan Carlos University (URJC).

Honours

Club
 Primera División: 2016–17, 2017–18, 2018-19
 Copa de la Reina: 2016
 Supercopa de España: 2020-21

International
 Spain
 UEFA Women's Under-17 Championship: Winner 2010
 Algarve Cup: 2017
 Cyprus Cup: Winner, 2018

References

External links

 
 
 
 

1993 births
Living people
Spanish women's footballers
Spain women's international footballers
Primera División (women) players
Atlético Madrid Femenino players
Women's association football midfielders
Women's association football forwards
2015 FIFA Women's World Cup players
Footballers from Madrid
2019 FIFA Women's World Cup players
UEFA Women's Euro 2017 players
Spain women's youth international footballers